Luke 9 is the ninth chapter of the Gospel of Luke in the New Testament of the Christian Bible. It records the sending of the twelve disciples, several great miracles performed by Jesus, the story of his transfiguration,  Peter's confession and the final departure from Galilee towards Jerusalem. Scottish minister William Robertson Nicoll describes this chapter as unfolding "sundry particulars which together form the closing scenes of the Galilean ministry". The book containing this chapter is anonymous, but early Christian tradition uniformly affirmed that Luke the Evangelist composed this Gospel as well as the Acts of the Apostles.

Text 

The original text was written in Koine Greek. This chapter is divided into 62 verses.

Textual witnesses
Some early manuscripts containing the text of this chapter are:
Papyrus 75 (AD 175-225)
Papyrus 45 (~250)
Codex Vaticanus (325-350)
Codex Sinaiticus (330-360)
Codex Bezae (~400)
Codex Washingtonianus (~400)
Codex Alexandrinus (400-440)
Codex Ephraemi Rescriptus (~450)

Time 
American biblical writer Henry Hampton Halley states that between verses 17 and 18, about 8 months intervene.

The mission of the twelve (9:1-6)

Verse 1
 Then he [Jesus Christ] called his twelve disciples together, and gave them power and authority over all devils (or demons), and to cure diseases.
The Syriac version (only) reads "his own twelve".

Verse 2
He sent them to preach the kingdom of God and to heal the sick.
In the parallel account in Mark's Gospel they are sent out "in pairs".

Verse 3
And He said to them, “Take nothing for the journey, neither staffs nor bag nor bread nor money; and do not have two tunics apiece.
Cross reference: Matthew 10:10; Mark 6:8-9 
"Your journey": refers to the travel throughout the towns and cities, where they were sent to preach the Gospel.
"Neither staffs" (KJV: "staves"): The Latin Vulgate version and all the Oriental versions render in the singular number, "neither staff, rod, or club"; and so it was in one of Theodore Beza's ancient copies, but in all the rest in the plural, as in Matthew; which last must be the true reading, since one staff was allowed, according as in (Mark 6:8) though more than one were forbidden.
"Nor bag" (KJV: "scrip"): something to put provision in (cf. Matthew 10:10).
"Nor money": Not to bring gold, silver, or brass, to buy bread with, because they were to get food, wherever they came, be given as their due and the reward of their labor,
"Two tunics apiece": The word "apiece" is omitted in one manuscript and not included in the Vulgate Latin and the eastern versions, which read as in (Matthew 10:10) though the word does aptly and clearly express the sense of the prohibition, that each man should not have two, or have change of raiment.

Herod seeks to see Jesus (9:7-9)

Verse 7
Now Herod the tetrarch heard of all that was done by Him; and he was perplexed, because it was said by some that John had risen from the dead...
Herod the Tetrarch was Herod Antipas.  has the briefer words "When Herod heard". In his critical commentary, Heinrich Meyer suggests that Luke "evidently had [Mark] before him" and added "a definite object", namely "everything which was done", whereby is meant, "which was done by Jesus".

Verse 8
... and by some that Elijah had appeared, and by others that one of the old prophets had risen again.
The Old Testament prophet Elijah is mentioned five times in this chapter, here and at verses 19, 30, 33 and in some witnesses, verse 54.

Verse 9
Herod said, “John I have beheaded, but who is this of whom I hear such things?” So he sought to see Him.
A "glowing reception at court" might have awaited Jesus, but it did not materialise.

The feeding of the 5,000 (9:10-16)

This narrative, also known as the "miracle of the five loaves and two fish", records that five loaves and two fish were used by Jesus to feed a multitude. (verses 10-17). According to the Luke's narrative, when the twelve returned from their mission, Jesus withdrew with them by boat privately to a solitary place near Bethsaida. The crowds followed him on foot from the towns. When Jesus landed and saw a large crowd, he had compassion on them and healed their sick.

As evening approached, the disciples came to him and said, "This is a remote place, and it's already getting late. Send the crowds away, so they can go to the villages and buy themselves some food." Jesus said they do not need to go away therefore the disciples were to give them something to eat. They said they only had five loaves of bread and two fish then Jesus asked them to bring what they had to him. Jesus directed the people to sit down on the grass. Taking the five loaves and the two fish and looking up to heaven, he gave thanks and broke the loaves. Then he gave them to the disciples, and the disciples gave them to the people. They all ate and were satisfied, and the disciples picked up twelve basketfuls of broken pieces that were left over. The number of those who ate was about five thousand men (other gospels added "besides women and children").

Verse 20
He said to them, "But who do you say that I am?"Peter answered and said, "The Christ of God".Peter's answer to Jesus' question is often referred to as "Peter's confession". Presbyterian minister Marvin Vincent notes that "each evangelist gives Peter's confession differently".

The journey to Jerusalem
Verse 51And it came to pass, when the time was come that he should be received up, he stedfastly set his face to go to Jerusalem,The section from verse 51 of this chapter to  contains an account of the "Perean and Later Judean Ministry", covering the period between Jesus' final departure from Galilee and the final week of his ministry. It took place partly in Perea, and partly Judea. Perea, east of Jordan, was in Herod's jurisdiction, whereas Judea, west of Jordan, was in Pilate's jurisdiction. The Jerusalem Bible refers to this lengthy section as "The Journey to Jerusalem".

Verse 52And sent messengers before his face: and they went, and entered into a village of the Samaritans, to make ready for him.''
Nicoll notes that it is sometimes referred to as the "Samaritan ministry": initially Jesus' disciples visit a Samaritan village (Luke 9:52), where they are not well-received, and they continue to "another village", probably back in Galilee. F. W. Farrar raised the possibility that the Samaritan village was En Gannim (Fountain of Gardens), now Jenin in the northern West Bank, "the first village at which [a traveler taking the road from Galilee to Judea over Mount Tabor] would arrive".

Verses 56 and 57 
In , an anonymous person says to Jesus, "I will follow you wherever you go". In German, it became the title of a hymn "So nimm denn meine Hände" by Julie Hausmann, asking for guidance, and often used for funerals.

See also 
 Ministry of Jesus
 Miracles of Jesus
 Priamel
 Related Bible parts: Matthew 8, 10, 14, 16, 17, 18; Mark 6, 8, 9; John 6

References

External links 
 King James Bible - Wikisource
English Translation with Parallel Latin Vulgate
Online Bible at GospelHall.org (ESV, KJV, Darby, American Standard Version, Bible in Basic English)
Multiple bible versions at Bible Gateway (NKJV, NIV, NRSV etc.)

 
Luke 09
Bethsaida